Miss 501: A Portrait of Luck is a Canadian documentary film, directed by Clint Morrill under the pseudonym "Jules Karatechamp" and released in 2002. The film centres on Burger, a drag queen who is coming out of retirement to compete in the "Miss 501" drag pageant at Toronto's Bar 501.

The film premiered at the 2002 Sundance Film Festival. Morrill committed suicide a month after its premiere.

The film was posthumously screened at the 2002 Inside Out Film and Video Festival, where it won the juried award for Best Canadian Film.

References

External links
 

2002 films
Canadian documentary films
Canadian LGBT-related films
Documentary films about gay men
Drag (clothing)-related films
2002 LGBT-related films
2000s English-language films
2000s Canadian films